Thomas Arthur was a Scottish tailor who worked for James V of Scotland.

Arthur was made master tailor to the king in 1529. During the previous years of the king's minority, his clothes had been made by Andrew Edgar. 

Arthur's work is known through the accounts of the treasurer of Scotland, and inventories of the king's clothes. The published editions of the accounts by James Balfour Paul do not include the detail of the lining and secondary fabrics of costume, described in the original manuscripts in the National Archives of Scotland.

In January 1540 Arthur made "play coats" of red and yellow taffeta, and a side cape for one of the players. These costumes were for an early performance of David Lindsay's "A Satire of the Three Estates" in the Great Hall of Linlithgow Palace.

In February 1540 he made a bonnet to line the crown of Scotland which the goldsmith John Mosman had recently refurbished. The bonnet was made of purple velvet and lined with purple satin. 
Thomas Arthur worked in Edinburgh and would bring the clothes to the king at his palaces. His servants brought clothes to Stirling Castle in March 1540 and were given a reward or tip recorded as "drinksilver". At Easter 1541 he brought a coffer of clothes to Stirling Castle, including a black Venice satin doublet with gold buttons, and black hose. He also delivered new clothes to the King's servants, including the pursemaster John Tennent who would "deliver them where the king commanded".

He made clothes for the king's two sons, and mourning cloaks for ladies in waiting to wear at the funeral of Margaret Tudor in Perth in November 1541. In March 1542 he made a nightgown for Mistress Margaret, sister of the Earl of Lennox.

A lady-in-waiting Katherine Bellenden worked in the royal wardrobe. She sold cloth to Thomas Arthur. Her niece, also called Katherine Bellenden, married Robert Craig, one of Thomas Arthur's servant-tailors.

Arthur was not employed by Regent Arran. After the death of Thomas Arthur, in 1551 any money he had owed to James V was granted by Regent Arran to the soldier Robert Hamilton of Briggis and William Hamilton of Humbie.

A tailor called Thomas Arthur worked in England at this time, and in 1527 joined a company of actors. He entered into a legal dispute with George Maller, who was a glazier by trade, who had undertaken to train Arthur to be a player or "interluder" in the court revels of Henry VIII. It is not clear if this was the same man.

References

Court of James V of Scotland
16th-century Scottish businesspeople
British tailors
Material culture of royal courts